Raphael Strauss (1830–1901), was an American portrait artist of German descent, who worked in the United States during the latter half of the 19th century.

He was born in Bavaria, Germany in March, 1830. He immigrated to the United States and married Caroline Baermann in 1858. While in the United States, he lived most of his life in Cincinnati, Ohio. He was Vice President of the Cincinnati Art Club, and was listed in the city directory for more than 20 years.

He died in Cincinnati in 1901. He is buried in the Walnut Hills United Jewish Cemetery in Cincinnati.

Raphael and wife Caroline Goldstien were the parents of Joseph Strauss, a German–American structural engineer and designer.

Works
Examples of his work may be found at the Cincinnati Art Museum.
Raphael Strauss worked in Central Kentucky
Pair of Child Portraits by Raphael Strauss
Portrait of Young Girl

References

1830 births
1901 deaths
American portrait painters
Artists from Ohio
Artists from Cincinnati
German emigrants to the United States
19th-century American painters
19th-century American male artists
American male painters